Ampittia is the genus of bush hoppers in the skipper butterfly family, Hesperiidae. It is the only member of the tribe Ampittiini.

Species
 Ampittia capenas (Hewitson, 1868) – African bush hopper
 Ampittia dalailama (Mabille, 1876)
 Ampittia dioscorides (Fabricius, 1793) – (common) bush hopper
 Ampittia kilombero T.B. Larsen & Congdon, 2012
 Ampittia maroides de Nicéville, [1896]
 Ampittia nanus (Leech, 1890)
 Ampittia parva Aurivillius, 1925
 Ampittia sichunanensis Z.G. Wang & Y. Niu, 2002
 Ampittia trimacula (Leech, 1891)
 Ampittia tristella Shou, Chou & Li, 2006
 Ampittia virgata (Leech, 1890)
 Ampittia virgata miyakei Matsumura, 1910

References

 , 2012: The genus Ampittia in Africa with the description of a new species (Hesperiinae; Aeromachini) and three new species in the genera Andronymus and Chondrolepis (Hesperiinae, incertae sedis) (Lepidoptera; Hesperiidae). Zootaxa, 3322: 49-62.
 , 2002: New species of butterflies (Lepidoptera) from China, II. Entomotaxonomia 2002 (4): 276-284.

External links

Images representing Ampitia at Consortium for the Barcode of Life

 
Butterflies of Indochina
Hesperiidae genera